Fabrício Neis and Caio Zampieri were the defending champions but chose to defend their title with different partners. Neis partnered Guillermo Durán but lost in the semifinals to Ken and Neal Skupski. Zampieri partnered Sergio Galdós but lost in the first round to Julian Ocleppo and Andrea Pellegrino.

Skupski and Skupski won the title after defeating Julian Knowle and Igor Zelenay 5–7, 6–4, [10–5] in the final.

Seeds

Draw

References
 Main Draw

Venice Challenge Save Cup - Doubles
XV Doubles